Klyuchevo is a rural locality (a village) in Paustovskoye Rural Settlement, Vyaznikovsky District, Vladimir Oblast, Russia. The population was 7 as of 2010.

Geography 
Zlobayevo is the nearest rural locality.

References 

Rural localities in Vyaznikovsky District